The San Diego Film Critics Society Award for Best Director is an award given by the San Diego Film Critics Society to honor the finest directing achievementes in filmmaking.

Winners

1990s

2000s

2010s

2020s

References
San Diego Film Critics Society  - Awards

Awards for best director